Kandrian Inland Rural LLG is a local-level government (LLG) of West New Britain Province, Papua New Guinea.

Wards
01. Akivru
02. Gogor
03. Loko Bush
04. Mulus
05. Miu
06. Avet
07. Awon
08. Amumsong
09. Palan
10. Asengseng
11. Ngolu

References

Local-level governments of West New Britain Province